Tepe may refer to:

the Persian word for 'tell', a type of earthen mound
tepe, a common element in Persian-language toponyms; see 
Tepe, Bismil, a village in Turkey
Tepe, Dicle, a village in Turkey
Tepe, Iran, a village in Markazi Province, Iran
Tepe, Slovenia, a settlement in the Litija Municipality in Slovenia
Tépe, a village and municipality in Hungary
Göbekli Tepe, an archaeological site in Turkey 
A type of interdental brush

See also
Tappeh (disambiguation), places in Iran